Horčápsko is a municipality and village in Příbram District in the Central Bohemian Region of the Czech Republic. It has about 80 inhabitants.

Administrative parts
The village of Stará Voda is an administrative part of Horčápsko.

References

Villages in Příbram District